The 2008 Men's Pan American Junior Championship was the 9th edition of the Pan American Junior Championship for men. It was held from 17 to 26 October 2008 in Port of Spain. Cuba.

The tournament served as a qualifier for the 2009 Junior World Cup, held in Singapore and Johor Bahru, Malaysia in June 2009.

Argentina won the tournament for the 9th time, defeating Chile 3–0 in the final. The United States won the bronze medal by defeating Canada 7–6 in penalties following a 2–2 draw.

Participating nations
A total of eleven teams participated in the tournament:

Results

Preliminary round

Pool A

Pool B

Classification round

Ninth to eleventh place classification

Crossover

Ninth and tenth place

Fifth to eighth place classification

Crossover

Seventh and eighth place

Fifth and sixth place

First to fourth place classification

Semi-finals

Third and fourth place

Final

Awards

Final rankings

Goalscorers

References

External links
Pan American Hockey Federation

Pan American Junior Championship
Pan American Junior Championship
International field hockey competitions hosted by Trinidad and Tobago
Pan American Junior Championship
Sport in Port of Spain
Pan American Junior Championship
21st century in Port of Spain